Dalhousie cantonment is a town in Chamba district  in the state of Himachal Pradesh, India.

History
In the wake of the 1857 War, the Military Department of the Government of India,  expanded its survey  of lower Himalayas, to identify  suitable locations for  building "sanitaria and cantonments" for "quartering" British soldiers and military units. The move to locate  cantonments in "cool and healthy hill stations" was justified on strategic, and health  grounds. In the  following decade   several cantonments, including in Balun (Dalhousie), Bakloh,  Chakrata, Ranikhet, in the western lower Himalayas, were established. In 1863 it was decided that one third of  the British troops in India should be located in  the hill station cantonments. By the 1890s  almost twenty five percent of the British   troops in India were located in hill stations.

The  Cantonment area in Dalhousie  is called  Baloon,  also spelt as Balun. In 1868,  British troops moved into barracks in Baloon. By 1878 an  18 foot road  connected the new cantonment to the plains.

In August 1954, during the Dalhousie centenary celebrations, Jawahar Lal Nehru, the prime minister of India, visited Baloon, Dalhousie Cantonment. He was accompanied by Lt General Kalwant Singh, General Officer Commanding in Chief, Western Command.

Cantonment Board
Dalhousie  cantonment  was established in 1867. It  has been classified as a category IV Cantonment by  Director General of Defence estates. The  cantonment board, which is responsible for the management of the cantonment,  consists of 4 members, including two elected members. Brig. JS Bhardwaj, Commander 323 Mountain Brigade, is the President of the Cantonment Board.

The cantonment board runs a primary school (24 students), a small hospital (two beds), and a guest house.

Churches
There are four churches in Dalhousie.  St. Andrew's Church and St. Patrick's Church, are located in Balun, Dalhousie Cantonment.

Geography
It has an average elevation of 1954 metres (6410 feet).

Location
Although there is an airport in Pathankot also but mostly flights are from Kangra.

Demographics
According to the 2001 India census, Dalhousie cantonment had a population of 1962. Males constitute 56% of the population and females 44%. Dalhousie has an average literacy rate of 76%, higher than the national average of 65.38%.  Male literacy is 79% and, female literacy is 72%. In Dalhousie, 14% of the population is under 6 years of age. Dalhousie is a very popular tourist destination with its most popular attraction is the Khajjiar Valley.

References

External links
 Indian Army Facilities

Cities and towns in Chamba district
Cantonments of India
Cantonments of British India
Hill stations in Himachal Pradesh
1866 establishments in India